Judith Irene Petts CBE (born 7 January 1954) is a British academic and the Vice-Chancellor of Plymouth University.

Academic career
She graduated from the University of Exeter with a BA in geography in 1975. She was a research fellow in the Institute for Planning Studies, University of Nottingham and then joined Loughborough University where she completed her PhD in 1996 and became Director of the Centre for Hazard and Risk Management.

In 1998, she became Professor of Environmental Risk Management and later Head of the School of Geography, Earth and Environmental Sciences at the University of Birmingham, serving as Pro-Vice-Chancellor 2007–2010. In 2010, she joined the University of Southampton as the Dean of the Faculty of Social and Human Sciences and Pro-Vice-Chancellor for Research and Enterprise.

In February 2016, she was appointed the University of Plymouth's Vice-Chancellor and Chief Executive.

Appointments and honours
Professor Petts served as a member of the Council of NERC 2000–2006 and the NERC Innovation Board 2014–2018. She is an associate of the Centre for Science and Policy at the University of Cambridge.
She was a Government advisor as a member of the Royal Commission on Environmental Pollution (2006–2011) and the Science Advisory Council of Defra (2011–2016).
In 2012, she was awarded a CBE for services to scientific research.

Personal life
She was married to Profressor Geoffrey Petts (d. August 2018).

References

1954 births
Living people
Alumni of the University of Exeter
Alumni of Loughborough University
Commanders of the Order of the British Empire